Fernando González Valenciaga (1 February 1921 – 3 January 1988), better known as Nando, was a Spanish football player who took part in the 1950 FIFA World Cup.

References

External links

1921 births
1988 deaths
Spanish footballers
Spain international footballers
1950 FIFA World Cup players
La Liga players
Athletic Bilbao footballers
Racing de Santander players
SD Indautxu footballers
Association football midfielders
Footballers from Getxo
Spanish football managers
Racing de Santander managers
La Liga managers
Segunda División managers